Scurvy weed is a common name for several flowering plants and may refer to:

Commelina cyanea, native to Australia
Commelina ensifolia, native to Australia, India, and Sri Lanka
Tradescantia albiflora, native to South America